"Wish You Were Here" is a song by American rock band Incubus and the lead single from their fourth studio album, Morning View. Released on August 14, 2001, it peaked at number two on the US Billboard Modern Rock Tracks chart and number four on the Billboard Mainstream Rock chart that year. "Wish You Were Here" would become one of the band's most well known songs and be included on the 2009 greatest hits compilation Monuments and Melodies.

The song is featured in the video game Donkey Konga 2. The song was also used on then ABC affiliate KAQY's station IDs in the early 2000s (the station is now known today as MeTV affiliate KMLU in Monroe, Louisiana).

Background, music, and lyrics
Prior to release, the track was played during Moby's Area:One summer festival in 2001. It was announced as Morning View'''s lead single in June that year. Guitarist Mike Einziger noted that "Wish You Were Here" was one of the last songs written for Morning View and that "the content is about being happy living for the moment and not looking forward to the future as some event." Vocalist Brandon Boyd also elaborated on its meaning: "The song wasn't specifically about a person. It was about me acknowledging a very brief moment in my life and in my experience with all of these guys in making this record. In that moment, I wish that I had somebody to go, 'I love you, man.' I was wishing that there was someone there to share that moment with." 

Music videos
A music video for "Wish You Were Here" was scheduled for an August 2001 shooting with director Phil Harder. Einziger anticipated finishing everything within a single day like previous Incubus videos had been made. Although it could be streamed from the band's website, in light of the recent September 11 attacks where victims leapt from the Twin Towers, the original "Wish You Were Here" video would be rejected. Boyd remarked on the video's controversy:

The second version, which found substantial airplay upon its late September premiere, has the band performing in front of a white backdrop, a light breeze blowing toward them. The quickly composed substitute mixed the Phil Harder white-backdrop footage with various "home video"-styled footage shot and edited by Brett Spivey of the band members during album production at their Morning View house, including in their control room, at their swimming pool, playing ocean-view lawn golf, and enjoying other summer activities. By December 2001, it reached number eight on MTV's TRL.

In May 2002, the original "bridge jump" version as well as behind the scenes footage would be included on the Morning View Sessions DVD. The video would also air years later on Fuse TV.

Live performances
"Wish You Were Here" was performed on the Late Show with David Letterman on November 1, 2001. Upon winning Billboards Modern Rock Single of the Year for "Drive," Incubus performed "Wish You Were Here" at the award show.

Cover versions
In 2015, Lower Than Atlantis released a cover of the song on the 2015 reissue of their self-titled album.

Track listingsAustralian CD single "Wish You Were Here"
 "Mexico" (live)
 "The Warmth" (live)
 "Drive" (live)European CD single "Wish You Were Here"
 "Drive" (live)European CD EP "Wish You Were Here"
 "Mexico" (live)
 "Drive" (live)
 "The Warmth" (live)
 "Wish You Were Here" (live)UK CD single "Wish You Were Here" (live)
 "The Warmth" (live)
 "Mexico" (live)UK DVD single'''
 "Wish You Were Here" (video—live at 'The Morning View Sessions')
 "Wish You Were Here" (audio)
 "A Certain Shade of Green" (audio)
 "A Certain Shade of Green" (video)
 "Pardon Me" (video)
 "Stellar" (video)
 "Take Me to Your Leader" (video)

Charts

Release history

References

External links
 "Wish You Were Here" music video (second version)

2000s ballads
2001 singles
2001 songs
Incubus (band) songs
Music videos directed by Phil Harder
Rock ballads
Song recordings produced by Scott Litt
Songs written by Alex Katunich
Songs written by Brandon Boyd
Songs written by Chris Kilmore
Songs written by José Pasillas
Songs written by Mike Einziger
Epic Records singles
Immortal Records singles